TAPR can mean:

Tucson Amateur Packet Radio
TAPR Open Hardware License